Chris Heintz may refer to:
 Chris Heintz (baseball)
 Chris Heintz (aeronautical engineer)